Kazuhiro Morita (森田一浩 or Morita Kazuhiro, born 1952 in Tokyo; died 2021) was a Japanese composer and arranger.

Morita studied with Yoshio Hasegawa at the Tokyo University of the Arts. He is known as an arranger, reworking pieces like Appalachian Spring by Aaron Copland, Galánta Dances by Zoltán Kodály, Don Juan and an excerpt from Salome by Richard Strauss, The Miraculous Mandarin by Béla Bartók, Symphony No. 1 by Gustav Mahler, the second suite from the ballet Daphnis et Chloé by Maurice Ravel and the Rhapsody on a Theme of Paganini by Sergei Rachmaninoff. He is also noted for his arrangements of anime scores (including Castle in the Sky, Princess Mononoke, and Kiki's Delivery Service) and his original compositions. He teaches at Shobi University.

Works

Band

Pop Step March
Serenade
Flower Clock
Fanfare I
Mana in October
Canticle of the South

Chamber works

Aubade for clarinet ensemble
Bagatelles on the name of Bach for clarinet ensemble
Kumamoto Folk Tunes for clarinet ensemble
Pele for clarinet quartet
Rumba sequence for clarinet quartet
Elegia, Ritmica and Sambo-Ostinato for clarinet ensemble
Terpsichore I for brass octet

References

1952 births
Japanese classical composers
Japanese male classical composers
Japanese music arrangers
Living people